Pishan County as the official romanized name, also transliterated from Uyghur as Guma County, is a county within the Xinjiang Uyghur Autonomous Region and is under the administration of the Hotan Prefecture. According to the 2002 census, it has a population of 220,000. The county borders Maralbexi County and Makit County to the north, Karakax County, Hotan County and Kunyu to the east and Kargilik County to the west. The county includes lands near the Karakoram Pass which are part of the Aksai Chin area that is disputed between China and India.

History
In 1902, Pishan County was created from Guma, Sanju and other areas originally part of Kargilik.

In March 1950, the Pishan County People's Government was established.

In May 2010, Shahidulla (Xaidula/Saitula) was made a town.

On the night of December 28, 2011, Koxtag (Kuoshi Tage) in Pishan was the site of the 2011 Pishan hostage crisis.

In 2012/3, Muji was changed from a township into a town.

On July 3, 2015, the 2015 Pishan earthquake occurred, killing three and wounding 71.

On July 24, 2015, Koxtag was changed from a township to a town.

On January 9, 2016, Sanju was changed from a township to a town.

Geography
The northern part of Pishan/Guma County is made up of sand dunes in the Taklamakan Desert. The main part of the population of the county is grouped around oasis areas at the base of the Kunlun Mountains. The southern part of the county is mountainous including the Qizil Koran Range. A prominent mountain pass in the area is Sanju Pass. A prominent lake in the area is Cuolule Co (Cuolule Cuo, Tsorūl Tso).

Climate

Administrative divisions
The county is made up of one subdistrict, six towns, ten townships and two other areas:

Subdistrict:
 Pishan County Subdistrict

Towns:
 Guma ( / )
 Duwa ( / )
 Muji (Mu-chi;  / , formerly  / )
 Koxtag (Kuoshitage, Qoshtagh, Kuoshi Tage, K'o-shih-t'a-ko;  / , formerly  / )
 Sanju (Sangzhu;  / , formerly  / )
 Shahidulla (Saitula, Sheydulla;  / )

Townships:
 Kilian, Xinjiang (Keliyang;  / )
 Kokterak (Keketiereke, Köktërek;  / )
 Choda (Qiaoda;  / )
 Mokoyla (Mukuila, Mo-kuei-la;  / )
 Zangguy (Canggui;  / )
 Piyalma (Piyalema;  / )
 Pixna (Pixina, Pishna;  / )
 Bashlengger (Bashilangan;  / )
 Nawabat Tajik Township (Nao'abati;  / )
 Kangkir Kyrgyz Township (Kangke'er, Kengqir;  / )

Others:
 Pishan Sanxia Industrial Park
 Pishan Regiment Farm

Economy

The county produces rice, wheat, cotton, apricots, peaches, grapes, silkworms and furs. Coal, gypsum and mica are mined in the county. Industries include tractor repair, carpet making and food processing. Local specialities include sangpi paper and walnuts.

, there was about 54,600 acres (360,891 mu) of cultivated land in Guma.

Demographics

In the late 2010s, ethnic minorities made up 98.4% of the population of the county, mainly Uyghurs. In 2011, Han Chinese accounted for less than 2% of the population of Pishan.

As of 2015, 290,016 of the 296,075 residents of the county were Uyghur, 3,788 were Han Chinese and 2,271 were from other ethnic groups.

As of 1999, 97.85% of the population of Guma (Pishan) County was Uyghur and 1.32% of the population was Han Chinese.

Transportation
 China National Highway 219
 China National Highway 315

Notable persons
 Ablajan Awut Ayup, pop singer
 Ghojimuhemmed Muhemmed, modern poet
 Osmanjan Muhemmed Pas’an, modern poet

Historical maps

Notes

References

County-level divisions of Xinjiang
Hotan Prefecture